Oh! Mother Russia is a compilation album by the Spanish rock band Dover. It was released in Japan on 23 November 2005 under a German-Japanese independent record label, Solitary Man Records.

This collection spans 4 years of songs from the albums Late at Night (1999), I Was Dead for 7 Weeks in the City of Angels (2001) and The Flame (2003).

Track listing

Personnel 
Dover
 Cristina Llanos – vocals and guitar
 Amparo Llanos – guitar
 Jesús Antúnez – drums
 Álvaro Díez – bass guitar

References

External links 
 

2005 compilation albums
Dover (band) compilation albums